Canada, represented by the Canadian Olympic Committee (COC), competed at the 2008 Summer Olympics in Beijing, China, from August 8 to 24, 2008. Canadian athletes had competed in every Summer Olympic Games since 1900 with the exception of 1980, which were boycotted in protest of the Soviet invasion of Afghanistan. Canada sent 332 athletes in 25 sports, the seventh largest team at the games and Canada's largest since 1988. Canada did not send a team in handball, volleyball or basketball. Kayaker and 2004 Summer Olympics gold medalist Adam van Koeverden was the flag bearer at the opening ceremonies; Karen Cockburn bore the flag at the closing.

The COC had set a goal of finishing in the top 16 in total medals; at the 2004 Summer Olympics, Canada finished 19th. Despite failing to win a single medal in the first week of the Games, Canada would rebound, winning a combined 18 medals in the next 9 days.  This 9-day medal haul exceeded the 12 medals Canada won in Athens four years earlier.  The country would wind up finishing 19th in gold medals and 14th in total medals in Beijing. Equestrian show jumper Ian Millar competed at his ninth Summer Olympics, tying the record set by Hubert Raudaschl. He has been named to ten straight Olympic teams, but did not compete at the 1980 Summer Olympics due to the Canadian boycott. For the first time, Canadian athletes were paid for medals earned. Gold medalists earned $20,000; silver medalists were paid $15,000; and bronze medalists $10,000. A total of $515,000 from the Athlete Excellence Fund was given to the medal winning athletes.

Canada was the next host country of an Olympics, with Vancouver hosting the 2010 Winter Olympics.

Medallists

Archery

Canada qualified its men's team by finishing eighth during the 2007 world championships. The individuals later qualified at the Canadian Olympic archery trials. It was Canada's first three-man team since the 1992 Summer Olympics. Canada also qualified an archer in the women's division after the Netherlands waived its quota for the women's archery competition.

Athletics

Previous world champion hurdler Perdita Felicien officially announced on July 14 that she would not compete. This followed a foot fracture sustained during a February training session. Dylan Armstrong established a new Canadian record in the shot put.

Men
Track & road events

Field events

Combined events – Decathlon

Women
Track & road events

Field events

Combined events – Heptathlon

* The athlete who finished in second place, Lyudmila Blonska of the Ukraine, tested positive for a banned substance. Both the A and the B tests were positive, therefore Blonska was stripped of her silver medal, and Zelinka moved up a position.

Badminton

Canada was represented by two singles players and a mixed doubles team.

Baseball

Men's team
Canada qualified its men's baseball team for the Olympics by winning the final Olympic Baseball qualification tournament with a 6–1 record. Canada went 2–5 in the tournament, but all five losses came by one run, including one in extra innings.

James Avery – P (replacement for Scott Richmond)
Chris Begg – P (RH)
T. J. Burton – P (RH)
Stubby Clapp – 2B
Rhéal Cormier – P (LH)
David Corrente – C
David Davidson – P (LH)
Emerson Frostad – 1B/C
Emmanuel Garcia – SS
Steve Green – P (RH)
Mike Johnson – P (RH)
Brett Lawrie – C/INF/OF
Jonathan Lockwood – P (RH)
Brooks McNiven – P (RH)
Ryan Radmanovich – OF
Chris Reitsma – P (RH)
Chris Robinson – C
Matt Rogelstad – INF
Michael Saunders – OF
Adam Stern – OF
Scott Thorman – 1B
Jimmy Van Ostrand – 1B/OF
Nick Weglarz – OF

Round Robin

Boxing

Twelve years after qualifying boxers in 11 of 12 events in 1996, Canada only sent one boxer to Beijing. Adam Trupish qualified for the Olympics by reaching the quarterfinal at the 2007 AIBA World championships.

Canoeing

Slalom
Canada had a three-person slalom team in Beijing.

Sprint
For the first time ever, Canada had participants in all twelve sprint races.

Men

Women

Qualification Legend: QS = Qualify to semi-final; QF = Qualify directly to final

Cycling

Road 
Canada qualified three athletes for the men's road race and the right to send a cyclist to the time trial event. To be eligible to compete in the men's time trial, an athlete must have also competed in the road race or in a track, mountain bike or BMX event.

Men

Women

Track

Mountain biking
Canada qualified its riders via the UCI ranking by nations.

BMX
Canada qualified a female entry for the event, which was contested at the Olympics for the first time, via the UCI Nations ranking and a male entry via the 2008 UCI BMX World Championships.

Diving

Ten Canadian athletes qualified for the Olympics, and competed in six of the eight diving events. Spots were allocated at the Olympic Trials, held in Victoria, B.C., June 20 to June 22.

Men

Women

Equestrian

Dressage

Eventing

# – Indicates that points do not count in team total

Show jumping

Fencing

Canada qualified all of its current quota places via the world ranking (Pan-Am zone). Philippe Beaudry qualified for the Sabre individual event at the last chance continental qualifier held in Querétaro, Mexico.

Men

Women

Field hockey

Canada's men's team qualified for Beijing by defeating Argentina 2–2 (5–4 on penalties) in the final of the 2007 Pan-American games.

Men's tournament

Roster

Group play

Classification match for 9th/10th place

Football

Canada's national women's team qualified by finishing in the top two at the CONCACAF Olympic qualifying tournament.

Women's tournament

Roster

Group play

Quarterfinal

Gymnastics

Artistic
Canada has qualified a six-man team and two women for Beijing.

Men
No Canadian man made an apparatus final, with Kyle Shewfelt finishing ninth on vault and eleventh on floor exercise in the qualifying round. The Canadian team similarly failed to advance to the final, finishing ninth and missing out by less than four-tenths of a point. Two Canadian men, Adam Wong and Nathan Gafuik, did advance to the all-around final. Ken Ikeda and Jared Walls were the reserves for the men's team.

Team

Individual finals

Women
Finishing in fourteenth place at the 2007 World Gymnastics Championships (Only the top 12 teams qualified), Canada failed to qualify a full women's team to the Olympics.

Rhythmic
If Brazil had withdrawn from the group all-around competition, they would have been replaced by Canada.

Trampoline

Three trampolinists competed for Canada in Beijing.

Judo

Four men and one woman will represent Canada in Judo.

Men

Women

Modern pentathlon

Josh Riker-Fox and Monica Pinette qualified for Beijing by respectively finishing third and second at the 2007 Pan-American Games and Kara Grant qualified via the world rankings.

Rowing

Canada sent eight boats to Beijing in rowing, of which four (half of the quota) finished with medals.

Men

Women

Qualification Legend: FA=Final A (medal); FB=Final B (non-medal); FC=Final C (non-medal); FD=Final D (non-medal); FE=Final E (non-medal); FF=Final F (non-medal); SA/B=Semifinals A/B; SC/D=Semifinals C/D; SE/F=Semifinals E/F; QF=Quarterfinals; R=Repechage

Sailing

Canada earned a quota in all the classes above during the 2007 ISAF Sailing World Championships held in Cascais, Portugal, except for the quota in the Tornado class, which was earned at the 2008 Tornado World Championships in Auckland, New Zealand.

Men

Women

Open

M = Medal race; EL = Eliminated – did not advance into the medal race; CAN = Race cancelled;

Shooting

Four shooters represented Canada in Beijing.

Men

Women

Softball

Women's Softball
Lauren Bay Regula
Alison Bradley
Erin Cumpstone
Danielle Lawrie
Sheena Lawrick
Caitlin Lever
Robin Mackin
Noemie Marin
Melanie Matthews
Erin McLean
Dione Meier
Kaleigh Rafter
Jennifer Salling
Megan Timpf
Jennifer Yee

Results
Round Robin
All times are China Standard Time (UTC+8)

Swimming

The places in Canada's Olympic swim team were allocated at the 2008 CN Olympic Trials.

Men

Women

Synchronized swimming

Canada qualified for both events by finishing third in the team event at the "Good Luck Beijing" 2008 Olympic Games Synchronized Swimming Qualification Tournament.

Table tennis

Canada sent five table tennis players to Beijing.

Singles

Team

Taekwondo

Canada's Sébastien Michaud and Ivett Gonda qualified Canada in the men's −80 kg and the women's −49 kg by respectively finishing first and third at the World Taekwondo Qualification Tournament in Manchester, United Kingdom. World champion Karine Sergerie secured an additional berth for Canada, this time in the women's −67 kg, by finishing second at the Pan American Taekwondo Qualification Tournament in Cali, Colombia. In Beijing 2008, Sergerie made Silver after advancing to the finals opposite to Kyungseon of Korea who secured the gold.

Tennis

Canada was represented by three men in tennis.

Triathlon

Canada is one of five nations sending a full complement of six triathletes to Beijing.

Water polo

Men's tournament

Canada's men's team qualified by reaching the semifinal at the FINA men's Water Polo Olympic Qualification Tournament, beating host Romania 9–8. The team finished in 11th place.

Roster

Group play

All times are China Standard Time (UTC+8).

Classification round (7th–12th place)

Classification round (11th–12th place)

Weightlifting

Canada qualified three female Weightlifters by finishing fourteenth in the combined country ranking of the 2006 and 2007 World Weightlifting Championships. Canada then qualified two men's weightlifters by finishing second among non-qualified teams at the 2008 Pan American Championships held in Callao, Peru.

Christine Girard, who competed in the women's 63 kg category initially finished in fourth place. However, her performance was elevated to third place after the disqualification of the second place athlete from Kazakhstan, following the re-tests of the urine samples conducted by the IOC in 2016.

Wrestling

Seven athletes qualified at the 2008 Pan-American Wrestling Championships while Travis Cross and Carol Huynh qualified by finishing in the top 8 at the 2007 Wrestling World Championships and David Zilberman qualified at the first freestyle qualification tournament.

Men's freestyle

Men's Greco-Roman

Women's freestyle

Official outfitter
HBC was the official outfitter of clothing for members of the Canadian Olympic team.

See also
 Canada at the 2008 Summer Paralympics
 Canada at the 2007 Pan American Games

References

External links
sports-reference
List of Canadian qualifiers at TSN.ca
CTV.ca Beijing 2008
Day by day results: Day 2, Day 3, Day 4, Day 5, Day 6, Day 7, Day 8, Day 9, Day 10, Day 11, Day 12, Day 13, Day 14, Day 15, Day 16 at TSN.ca

Nations at the 2008 Summer Olympics
2008
Summer Olympics